Lathyrus delnorticus is an uncommon species of wild pea known by the common name Del Norte pea. It is native to the Klamath Mountains of southern Oregon and northern California, where it is a member of the serpentine soils flora. This is a hairless perennial herb producing a winged or flanged stem. The leaves are made up of several pairs of oval or lance-shaped leaflets and the stipules of the leaves are wide and toothed. There are branching, coiled tendrils. The plant bears a dense inflorescence of up to 10 pea lavender-veined white flowers each up to 1.5 centimeters wide. The fruit is a hairless dehiscent legume pod.

External links
Jepson Manual Treatment
USDA Plants Profile
Photo gallery

delnorticus
Flora of California
Flora of the Klamath Mountains
Flora of Oregon
Natural history of Del Norte County, California
Flora without expected TNC conservation status